Khushab District (Punjabi), is a district in the province of Punjab, Pakistan, with its administrative capital in Jauharabad. The district is named after the historical city of Khushab located within its boundaries. According to the 1998 census, the population was 905,711 with 24.76% living in urban areas. The district consists of four tehsils: Khushab, Noorpur Thal, Quaidabad and Naushera. Khushab is home to the Heavy Water and Natural Uranium Research Reactor, part of Pakistan's Special Weapons Program.

Geography
Khushab is situated between the cities of Sargodha and Mianwali, near the river Jhelum. The district capital is Jauharabad (founded 1953, pop. 39,477).

Khushab consists of agricultural lowland plains, lakes, and hills.

There are three lakes (Ochali, Khabbaki, and Jahlar) in the district. Kanhatti Garden is the largest forest in Khushab district, near Khabbaki village in the Soon Valley.  Khabikki Lake is a salt-water lake in the southern Salt Range. The lake is one kilometre wide and two kilometres long. Khabikki is also the name of a neighbouring village. Sakesar is the highest mountain in the Salt Range, and is the site of the ancient Amb Temples. Sakesar’s summit is 1522 metres / 4946 feet high and is situated in Khushab District.

Demographics
At the time of the 2017 census the district had a population of 1,281,299, of which 637,474 were males and 642,791 females. Rural population is 927,412 while the urban population is 352,960. The literacy rate was 59.75%. Muslims were the predominant religious community with 99.02% of the population while Christians were 0.82% of the population.

According to the 1998 census the major first language of the district is Punjabi, spoken by 96.8% of the population, with Urdu spoken by 1.5%.

Education
According to Pakistan District Education Ranking, a report released by Alif Ailaan, Khushab is ranked 42 nationally with an education score of 65.42 and learning score of 65.82.

The readiness score of Khushab is 62.33. The infrastructure score of the district is 88.11, which indicates that the schools in Khushab have adequate facilities

The issues reported in TaleemDo! app says that there are some areas where there are no government schools for girls. Another major issue reported was that teachers don't do their jobs properly and don't do justice to their profession.

Administrative divisions
Khushab got the status of district in 1982. At the start, the district was divided into two tehsils, Khushab, Noorpur Thal. Later on Quaidabad was given the status of Tehsil in March 2007  and Naushera (Wadi e Soon) became 4th Tehsil of District Khushab in March 2013. In the local bodies delimitation of 2000 (before the creation of the Tehsil Quaidabad and Naushehra), it contained a total of fifty-one Union Councils. In the 2015 delimitation of District Khushab, 48 rural union councils and 7 urban Municipal Committees were created by the election Commission of Pakistan.

Khushab Tehsil
In 2000, Tehsil Khushab was subdivided into 32 Union councils; but in 2015, 10 urban Union councils (Khushab 5, Jauharabad 2, Hadali 2 and Mitha Tiwana 1) transferred to Municipal Committees whereas six Union councils have become the part of Tehsil Naushehra. Now Tehsil Khushab has 18 Union councils and 5 Municipal Committees:

Union Councils
Botala
Chak No.50/Mb
Daiwal
Hassanpur Tiwana
Jabbi Shareef
Katha Saghral
Kund

Union Councils
Lukoo
Mohibpur
Dhak Janjua
Nali Shumali
Nari
Padhrar
Roda
Sandral
Talloker
Waheer

Municipal Committee / Corporation
Khushab
Jauharabad
Hadali
Mitha Tiwana
Girote

Noorpur Thal Tehsil
Noorpur Thal is subdivided into 12 Union Councils and 1 Municipal Committee.

Union Councils
Adhi Kot
Adhi Sarkal
Biland
Jamali Noorpur
Jaura Kalan
Jharkal

Union Councils
Khai Khurd
Khatwan
Pelowaince
Rahdari
Rangpur
Noorpur Rural
Municipal Committee
Noorpur

Quaidabad Tehsil
Quaidabad is subdivided into 10 Union Councils and 2 Municipal Committees.Union CouncilsBandial Janubi
Bijar
Chak No.14/Mb
Choha
Goleywali
Gunjial Janubi
Gunjial Shumali
Okhali Mohlah
Utra Janubi
WarchaMunicipal CommitteeQuaidabad
Mitha Tiwana

Naushera Tehsil
Naushera (Vadi e Soon) is subdivided into 6 Union Councils and 1 Municipal Committee.Union CouncilsAngah
Khabaki
Khura
Kufri
Mardwal
UchhaliMunicipal Committee'''
Naushera (Soon Valley)

Notable people
 Malik Shakir Bashir Awan, Politician, Lawyer, Social Activist
 Ahmed Nadeem Qasmi, Urdu poet, fiction writer, and journalist
 Wasif Ali Wasif, teacher, writer, poet, and Sufi
 Abdulqadir Hassan, writer and journalist 
 Idris Azad, philosopher, poet, fiction writer, and journalist
 Khushwant Singh, Indian novelist, lawyer, politician, and journalist
 Sohail Warraich, writer and journalist
 Malik Naeem Khan Awan, former Federal Minister of Pakistan
 Sumaira Malik, former Federal Minister of Pakistan & Granddaughter of Nawab of Kalabagh
 Feroz Khan Noon, former Prime Minister of Pakistan.
 Malik Khuda Buksh Tiwana, former Federal Minister of Pakistan

References

External links
Khushab District

 
Districts of Punjab, Pakistan